Nepalese New Zealanders or Nepali New Zealanders are citizens or permanent residents of New Zealand whose ethnic origins are fully or partially in Nepal.

Immigrants
Many Nepalese New Zealanders work in the dairy industry while there are others who are scholars, social workers and professors.

Hamilton has a small Nepalese community, with some families having gained permanent residence and citizenship, and there are others with student visas.

Many Lhotshampas or Bhutanese Nepalis who were expelled from Bhutan have been resettled in Nelson after New Zealand offered to settle 600 refugees over five years starting in 2008.

In the years since 2009, there has been a dramatic increase in Nepalese international students in New Zealand.

Festivals
The annual "Nepal Festival", organized by the various Nepali Community Organizations in New Zealand, was first held in Auckland in 2009, showcasing Nepalese culture including activities representing the different ethnicities of Nepal.

References

Asian New Zealander
New Zealand